Wilsthorpe Crossing Halt railway station was on the branch line between  and , Lincolnshire, England.

History
The B&ER was operated by the Great Northern Railway (GNR), which absorbed it on 25 July 1864.

Wilsthorpe had a small sidings, used for the delivery of coals to a local pumping station before the halt was opened.

In September 1925, the London and North Eastern Railway (LNER), which had been created on 1 January 1923 by the amalgamation of the GNR with several other railways, opened a station between Thurlby and Braceborough Spa, naming it Wilsthorpe Crossing Halt; it was adjacent to a level crossing on the road connecting Wilsthorpe with Manthorpe.

The station closed with the line on 18 June 1951.

References

External links
Braceborough Spa Halt on navigable 1946 O.S. map

Disused railway stations in Lincolnshire
Former London and North Eastern Railway stations
Railway stations in Great Britain opened in 1925
Railway stations in Great Britain closed in 1951
1925 establishments in England
1951 disestablishments in England